Ellen Fitzsimon (1805 – 27 January 1883) was an Irish poet.

Biography 
Ellen Fitzsimon was born Ellen Bridget O'Connell at Derrynane House, the third child and eldest daughter of Daniel and Mary O'Connell. She was well educated and spoke a number of languages. She was a close political ally of her father. Her poems appeared in Irish Monthly, The Nation, Duffy's Fireside Magazine, the Dublin Review. A single book of poems, Derrynane Abbey in 1832, and other Poems, was published in 1863.

On 25 July 1825, she married Christopher Fitzsimon Esq. of Glencullen, Co. Dublin, who was Clerk of the Crown and Hanaper and M.P. for Dublin County. The couple had 13 children:
Thomas Fitzsimon, died in infancy
Mary O'Connell Fitzsimon (1828-1877), married Henry Edmond Redmond
Daniel O'Connell Fitzsimon (1829-1844)
Christopher O'Connell Fitzsimon (1830-1884)
Henry Fitzsimon, died in infancy
Thomas Fitzsimon (1833-1858)
Henry O'Connell Fitzsimon (1835-1902)
Ellen Fitzsimon, died in infancy
Ellen "Eily" O'Connell Fitzsimon (25 January 1838 – 1919), married Charles Bianconi jnr, son of Charles Bianconi
Maurice Fitzsimon, died in infancy
Kathleen Henrietta O'Connell Fitzsimon (1842-1927), married Lt.Col. George Ludlow Kennedy Hewett
Maurice "Mossy" O'Connell Fitzsimon, died at 13
Morgan O'Connell Fitzsimon, died in infancy

Fitzsimon died in London on 27 January 1883 and is buried in Kensal Green Cemetery.

References

1805 births
1883 deaths
Irish poets
People from Iveragh Peninsula
Irish women poets
19th-century Irish poets
19th-century Irish women writers
19th-century Irish writers